In combinatorial mathematics, a De Bruijn torus, named after Dutch mathematician Nicolaas Govert de Bruijn, is an array of symbols from an alphabet (often just 0 and 1) that contains every possible matrix of given dimensions  exactly once.  It is a torus because the edges are considered wraparound for the purpose of finding matrices. Its name comes from the De Bruijn sequence, which can be considered a special case where  (one dimension).

It is known that these always exist when , since then we simply get the De Bruijn sequences, which always exist. It is also known that "square" tori exist whenever  and even (for the odd case the resulting tori cannot be square).

The smallest possible binary "square" de Bruijn torus, depicted above right, denoted as  de Bruijn torus (or simply as ), contains all  binary matrices.

B2

Apart from "translation", "inversion" (exchanging 0s and 1s) and "rotation" (by 90 degrees), no other  de Bruijn tori are possible – this can be shown by complete inspection of all 216 binary matrices (or subset fulfilling constrains such as equal numbers of 0s and 1s).

The torus can be unrolled by repeating n−1 rows and columns. All n×n submatrices without wraparound, such as the one shaded yellow, then form the complete set: 
{| class="wikitable"
| 1 || style="background:#ccc;"|0 || 1 || 1 || rowspan="5" style="border-left:solid; padding:0;"| || 1
|-
| 1 || style="background:#ccc;"|0 || style="background:#ccc;"|0 || style="background:#ccc;"|0 || 1
|-
| style="background:#ccc;"|0 || style="background:#ccc;"|0 || style="background:#ccc;"|0 || 1 || style="background:#ccc;"|0
|-
| 1 || 1 || style="background:#ccc;"|0 || style="background:#ff0;"|1 || style="background:#ff0;"|1
|- style="border-top:solid;"
| 1 || style="background:#ccc;"|0 || 1 || style="background:#ff0;"|1 || style="background:#ff0;"|1
|}

Larger example: B4

An example of the next possible binary "square" de Bruijn torus,  (abbreviated as B4), has been explicitly constructed.

The image on the right shows an example of a  de Bruijn torus / array, where the zeros have been encoded as white and the ones as red pixels respectively.

Binary de Bruijn tori of greater size
The paper in which an example of the  de Bruijn torus was constructed contained over 10 pages of binary, despite its reduced font size, requiring three lines per row of array.

The subsequent possible binary de Bruijn torus, containing all binary  matrices, would have  entries, yielding a square array of dimension , denoted a  de Bruijn torus or simply B6. This could easily be stored on a computer—if printed with pixels of side 0.1 mm, such a matrix would require an area of approximately 26×26 square metres.

The object B8, containing all binary  matrices and denoted , has a total of 264 ≈ 18.447×1018 entries: storing such a matrix would require 18.5 exabits, or 2.3 exabytes of storage. At the above scale, it would cover 429×429 square kilometres.

The following table illustrates the super-exponential growth.

See also
 De Bruijn sequence
 De Bruijn graph

References

External links
 Minimal arrays containing all sub-array combinations of symbols: De Bruijn sequences and tori

Combinatorics